Wild League (Croatian: Divlja liga) in Croatia is the most popular amateur water polo competition in the world. Matches are played on the beaches of Dubrovnik including Porporela, Danče, Bellevue, Šulić, and other beaches in the Riviera. The final match, however, happens in Porat (Old Town port) every year. Referees are professional (they have FINA and LEN licences). Better teams usually play people who have been trained in Jug and have been good in younger categories. Mihovil Španja, a Croatian professional swimmer, won the 2010 Wild League. Coaches of Solitudo are players of Croatia men's national water polo team, namely, Nikša Dobud, Pavo Marković, and Tihomil Vranješ. In 2007, the coach of Porporela was a player of the national team Andro Bušlje.

Wild League was not played in 2020 and 2021 due to COVID-19 pandemic.

Winners 

Notes
 Čingrija 1983 played with name Bellevue '73.
 1993 final match was stopped due to players fighting. 
 Reference http://www.divljaliga.hr/?page=povijest

Final matches 

 1983: Belevue '73 - Porporela 7:5
 1984: Danče - Montovjerna 8:5
 1985: Danče - Porporela 11:8
 1986: Čingrija - Danče 11:5
 1987: Student - Danče 4:3
 1988: Copacabana - Danče 8:6
 1989: Roxy - Copacabana 11:9
 1990: Gjivovići Dolphins - Copacabana 12:11
 1991: Copacabana - Danče 6:5
 1994: Roxy - Danče 9:8
 1996: KIKS 04 - Danče 8:7
 1997: KIKS 04 - Copacabana 11:9
 1998: Copacabana - KIKS 04 9:4
 1999: Bellevue '90 - Danče 5:4
 2000: KIKS 04 - Bellevue '90 7:4
 2001: KIKS 04 - Elita 9:4
 2002: Špilja '94 Danče - KIKS 04 8:7
 2003: Montovjerna - Copacabana 7:5
 2004: Copacabana - Montovjerna 5:3
 2005: Montovjerna - Copacabana 8:1
 2006: Palace - Penatur 8:7 (after penalties)
 2007: Porporela - Čingrija 7:4
 2008: Solitudo - Penatur 8:7
 2009: Solitudo - Čingrija 5:2
 2010: Penatur - Solitudo 8:6
 2011: Špilja '94 Danče - Kamen Mali Cavtat 7:5
 2012: Solitudo - Montovjerna 6:7
 2013: Fun H2O Mlini - Kamen Mali Cavtat 5:6
 2014: Palace - Fun H2O Mlini 3:3, 5:6 (penalties)
 2015: Kamen Mali Cavtat - Penatur 5:4
 2016: Elita - Fun H2O Mlini 13:3
 2017: Elita - Fun H2O Mlini 5:6
 2018: Elita - Porporela 8:8, 10:9 (penalties)
 2019: Kamen Mali Cavtat - Fun H2O Mlini 7:7, 2:1 (penalties)
 2022: Kokoti - FUN H2O Mlini 7:4

References

External links 

Official website of Wild League

Sport in Dubrovnik
Water polo competitions in Croatia